Poropuntius kontumensis is a species of ray-finned fish in the genus Poropuntius. This species is native to Cambodia and Viet Nam. Its species named after Kontum.

References 

kontumensis
Fish described in 1934